The 2011 Korea Grand Prix Gold was a badminton tournament which took place at Hanium Culture Sports Center in Hwasun, South Korea from 6 to 11 December 2011 and had a total purse of $120,000. This is for the first time this tournament was graded as a Grand Prix Gold event, where before rate as Grand Prix event. This tournament was part of the qualification stage of 2012 Summer Olympics.

Men's singles

Seeds

 Chen Jin (semi-finals)
 Simon Santoso (withdrew)
 Lee Hyun-il (champion)
 Wang Zhengming (third round)
 Tommy Sugiarto (quarter-finals)
 Shon Wan-ho (final)
 Dionysius Hayom Rumbaka (second round)
 Tanongsak Saensomboonsuk (withdrew)
 Hsu Jen-hao (third round)
 Muhammad Hafiz Hashim (withdrew)
 Derek Wong (first round)
 Liew Daren (quarter-finals)
 Mohamad Arif Abdul Latif (semi-finals)
 Sony Dwi Kuncoro (second round)
 Chong Wei Feng (quarter-finals)
 Chan Kwong Beng (third round)

Finals

Women's singles

Seeds

 Jiang Yanjiao (quarter-finals)
 Sung Ji-hyun (champion)
 Bae Yeon-ju (second round)
 Liu Xin (semi-finals)
 Li Xuerui (semi-finals)
 Yao Jie (first round)
 Lindaweni Fanetri (withdrew)
 Larisa Griga (first round)

Finals

Men's doubles

Seeds

 Jung Jae-sung / Lee Yong-dae (final)
 Ko Sung-hyun / Yoo Yeon-seong (champion)
 Hong Wei / Shen Ye (semi-finals)
 Goh Wei Shem / Lim Khim Wah (first round)
 Cho Gun-woo / Kim Ki-jung (quarter-finals)
 Huang Po-yi / Lu Chia-bin (first round)
 Ow Yao Han / Tan Wee Kiong (first round)
 Jürgen Koch / Peter Zauner (second round)

Finals

Women's doubles

Seeds

 Ha Jung-eun / Kim Min-jung (withdrew)
 Meiliana Jauhari / Greysia Polii (withdrew)
 Jung Kyung-eun / Kim Ha-na (second round)
 Shinta Mulia Sari / Yao Lei (final)

Finals

Mixed doubles

Seeds

 Lee Yong-dae / Ha Jung-eun (withdrew)
 Robert Mateusiak / Nadieżda Zięba (withdrew)
 Toby Ng / Grace Gao (first round)
 Danny Bawa Chrisnanta / Vanessa Neo (quarter-finals)
 Ko Sung-hyun / Eom Hye-won (semi-finals)
 Hong Wei / Pan Pan (first round)
 Kim Ki-jung / Jung Kyung-eun (final)
 Fran Kurniawan / Shendy Puspa Irawati (quarter-finals)

Finals

References

External links
 Tournament link

Korea Masters
Korea
Korea Grand Prix Gold
Korea Grand Prix Gold